Stake.com is an online casino. It is operated by Medium Rare NV, a company incorporated in Curaçao where it holds an online casino licence. It is a global company with offices in Serbia, Australia, Cyprus and staff globally.

History 
In 2016, Ed Craven and Bijan Tehrani established Easygo, a company which developed games for online casinos. The two helped create Stake.com which was founded in 2017.

In December 2021, Stake.com launched in the UK in partnership with TGP Europe.

Offerings 
Stake.com offers traditional casino games (such as slots, blackjack and roulette) and sports betting. It offers video streams with live dealers.

Users on Stake.com typically do not deal with traditional currencies, instead they deposit and withdraw cryptocurrencies to and from their betting account. Account balances can be withdrawn in the equivalent value of cryptocurrency and then deposited back into the user's personal cryptocurrency wallet. Users of Stake.com's UK site deal only in fiat currency.

Sponsorships 
Stake.com has invested in sponsorship deals across several sports, including with UFC fighter Israel Adesanya, English football teams Gillingham, Watford, Everton, Argentine footballer Sergio Agüero, Formula One reserve driver Pietro Fittipaldi and his brother, Formula 2 driver Enzo Fittipaldi, Canadian musician Drake, and the Gennady Golovkin vs. Ryōta Murata boxing match. 

In January 2023, the Alfa Romeo F1 team announced that Stake would be their title sponsor for the 2023 F1 season on a multi-year deal, with the team renamed to "Alfa Romeo F1 Team Stake".

References 

Online casinos
Gambling companies established in 2017